Aclerogamasus is a genus of mites in the family Parasitidae.

Species
 Aclerogamasus bicalliger (Athias, 1967)     
 Aclerogamasus motasi Juvara-Bais, 1977     
 Aclerogamasus stenocornis Witalinski, 2000

References

Parasitidae